The following lists events that happened during 1890 in Australia.

Incumbents

Premiers
Premier of New South Wales – Henry Parkes
Premier of South Australia – John Cockburn until 19 August, then Thomas Playford II
Premier of Queensland – Boyd Dunlop Morehead until 12 August, then Samuel Griffith
Premier of Tasmania – Philip Fysh
Premier of Western Australia – established from 29 December, John Forrest
Premier of Victoria – Duncan Gillies until 5 November, then James Munro

Governors
Governor of New South Wales – Victor Child Villiers, 7th Earl of Jersey  
Governor of Queensland – Henry Wylie Norman 
Governor of South Australia – Algernon Keith-Falconer, 9th Earl of Kintore 
Governor of Tasmania – Robert Hamilton 
Governor of Victoria – John Hope, 1st Marquess of Linlithgow 
Governor of Western Australia – William C. F. Robinson

Events
 1 January – The University of Tasmania opens
 28 February – The steamship RMS Quetta sinks off Cape York Peninsula, killing 133
2 October – Fire destroys buildings between Castlereagh, Moore and Pitt Streets valued at £750,000 sterling
 29 December – Sir John Forrest becomes the Premier of Western Australia and the first Premier in Australia.

Arts and literature

 26 April – Banjo Paterson's The Man from Snowy River is published.
 May – Tom Roberts' Shearing the Rams is first exhibited
 Verse by Adam Lindsay Gordon (1830-1870) set to music by Australian musician Theodore Tourrier (1846-1929)

Sport
31 May – The first Australian Championships in Athletics are held under the name Inter Colonial Meet. The men's competition is staged at the Moore Park in Sydney.
 November – Carbine wins the Melbourne Cup

Births
 2 March – Sir Malcolm Barclay-Harvey, Governor of South Australia 1939–1944 (died 1969)
 10 March – Albert Ogilvie, Premier of Tasmania (died 1939)
 18 July – Frank Forde, 15th Prime Minister of Australia (died 1983)
 29 August – Richard Gardiner Casey, Governor General of Australia (died 1976)
 10 September – Robert Heffron, Premier of New South Wales (died 1978)
 31 December – Daryl Lindsay, artist (died 1976)

Deaths
9 November - James Boag I, brewer (born 1822)

References

 
Years of the 19th century in Australia